Jacksonian democracy was a 19th century political philosophy in the United States that expanded suffrage to most white men over the age of 21, and restructured a number of federal institutions. Originating with the seventh U.S. president, Andrew Jackson and his supporters, it became the nation's dominant political worldview for a generation. The term itself was in active use by the 1830s.

This era, called the Jacksonian Era or Second Party System by historians and political scientists, lasted roughly from Jackson's 1828 election as president until slavery became the dominant issue with the passage of the Kansas–Nebraska Act in 1854 and the political repercussions of the American Civil War dramatically reshaped American politics. It emerged when the long-dominant Democratic-Republican Party became factionalized around the 1824 United States presidential election. Jackson's supporters began to form the modern Democratic Party. His political rivals John Quincy Adams and Henry Clay created the National Republican Party, which would afterward combine with other anti-Jackson political groups to form the Whig Party.

Broadly speaking, the era was characterized by a democratic spirit. It built upon Jackson's equal political policy, subsequent to ending what he termed a monopoly of government by elites. Even before the Jacksonian era began, suffrage had been extended to a majority of white male adult citizens, a result which the Jacksonians celebrated. Jacksonian democracy also promoted the strength of the presidency and the executive branch at the expense of the United States Congress, while also seeking to broaden the public's participation in government. The Jacksonians demanded elected, not appointed, judges and rewrote many state constitutions to reflect the new values. In national terms, they favored geographical expansionism, justifying it in terms of manifest destiny. There was usually a consensus among both Jacksonians and Whigs that battles over slavery should be avoided.

Jackson's expansion of democracy was largely limited to European Americans, and voting rights were extended to adult white males only. There was little or no change, and in many cases a reduction of the rights of African Americans and Native Americans during the extensive period of Jacksonian democracy, spanning from 1829 to 1860.

Philosophy

General principles
Historian Robert V. Remini, in 1999, stated that Jacksonian Democracy involved the belief that the people are sovereign, that their will is absolute and that the majority rules. 

William S. Belko, in 2015, summarized "the core concepts underlying Jacksonian Democracy" as:

Historian and social critic Arthur M. Schlesinger Jr. argued in 1945 that Jacksonian democracy was built on the following:
 Expanded suffrage – The Jacksonians believed that voting rights should be extended to all white men. By the end of the 1820s, attitudes and state laws had shifted in favor of universal white male suffrage and by 1856 all requirements to own property and nearly all requirements to pay taxes had been dropped.
 Manifest destiny – This was the belief that Americans had a destiny to settle the American West and to expand control from the Atlantic Ocean to the Pacific, and that the West should be settled by yeoman farmers. However, the Free Soil Jacksonians, notably Martin Van Buren, argued for limitations on slavery in the new areas to enable the poor white man to flourish—they split with the main party briefly in 1848. The Whigs generally opposed Manifest Destiny and expansion, saying the nation should build up its cities.
 Patronage – Also known as the spoils system, patronage was the policy of placing political supporters into appointed offices. Many Jacksonians held the view that rotating political appointees in and out of office was not only the right, but also the duty of winners in political contests. Patronage was theorized to be good because it would encourage political participation by the common man and because it would make a politician more accountable for poor government service by his appointees. Jacksonians also held that long tenure in the civil service was corrupting, so civil servants should be rotated out of office at regular intervals. However, patronage often led to the hiring of incompetent and sometimes corrupt officials due to the emphasis on party loyalty above any other qualifications.
 Strict constructionism – Like the Jeffersonians who strongly believed in the Kentucky and Virginia Resolutions, Jacksonians initially favored a federal government of limited powers. Jackson said that he would guard against "all encroachments upon the legitimate sphere of State sovereignty". However, he was not a states' rights extremist—indeed, the nullification crisis would find Jackson fighting against what he perceived as state encroachments on the proper sphere of federal influence. This position was one basis for the Jacksonians' opposition to the Second Bank of the United States. As the Jacksonians consolidated power, they more often advocated expanding federal power, presidential power in particular.
 Laissez-faire – Complementing a strict construction of the Constitution, the Jacksonians generally favored a hands-off approach to the economy as opposed to the Whig program sponsoring modernization, railroads, banking and economic growth. The chief spokesman amongst laissez-faire advocates was William Leggett of the Locofocos in New York City.
 Opposition to banking – In particular, the Jacksonians opposed government-granted monopolies to banks, especially the national bank, a central bank known as the Second Bank of the United States. Jackson said: "The bank is trying to kill me, but I will kill it!" and he did so. The Whigs, who strongly supported the Bank, were led by Henry Clay, Daniel Webster, and Nicholas Biddle, the bank chairman. Jackson himself was opposed to all banks because he believed they were devices to cheat common people—he and many followers believed that only gold and silver should be used to back currency, rather than the integrity of a bank.

Election by the "common man"
An important movement in the period from 1800 to 1830—before the Jacksonians were organized—was the gradual expansion of the right to vote from only property owning men to include all white men over 21. Older states with property restrictions dropped them, namely all but Rhode Island, Virginia, and North Carolina by the mid 1820s. No new states had property qualifications although three had adopted tax-paying qualifications—Ohio, Louisiana, and Mississippi, of which only in Louisiana were these significant and long lasting. The process was peaceful and widely supported, except in the state of Rhode Island. In Rhode Island, the Dorr Rebellion of the 1840s demonstrated that the demand for equal suffrage was broad and strong, although the subsequent reform included a significant property requirement for any resident born outside of the United States. However, free black men lost voting rights in several states during this period.

The fact that a man was now legally allowed to vote did not necessarily mean he routinely voted. He had to be pulled to the polls, which became the most important role of the local parties. They systematically sought out potential voters and brought them to the polls. Voter turnout soared during the 1830s, reaching about 80% of adult white male population in the 1840 presidential election. Tax-paying qualifications remained in only five states by 1860—Massachusetts, Rhode Island, Pennsylvania, Delaware and North Carolina.

One innovative strategy for increasing voter participation and input was developed outside the Jacksonian camp. Prior to the presidential election of 1832, the Anti-Masonic Party conducted the nation's first presidential nominating convention. Held in Baltimore, Maryland, September 26–28, 1831, it transformed the process by which political parties select their presidential and vice-presidential candidates.

Factions
The period from 1824 to 1832 was politically chaotic. The Federalist Party and the First Party System were dead and with no effective opposition, the old Democratic-Republican Party withered away. Every state had numerous political factions, but they did not cross state lines. Political coalitions formed and dissolved and politicians moved in and out of alliances.

More former Democratic-Republicans supported Jackson, while others such as Henry Clay opposed him. More former Federalists, such as Daniel Webster, opposed Jackson, although some like James Buchanan supported him. In 1828, John Quincy Adams pulled together a network of factions called the National Republicans, but he was defeated by Jackson. By the late 1830s, the Jacksonian Democrats and the Whigs—a fusion of the National Republicans and other anti-Jackson parties—politically battled it out nationally and in every state.

Founding of the Democratic Party

Jacksonian democracy

The spirit of Jacksonian democracy animated the party that formed around him, from the early 1830s to the 1850s, shaping the era, with the Whig Party the main opposition. The new Democratic Party became a coalition of poor farmers, city-dwelling laborers and Irish Catholics.

The new party was pulled together by Martin Van Buren in 1828 as Jackson crusaded on claims of corruption by President John Quincy Adams. The new party (which did not get the name Democrats until 1834) swept to a landslide. As Mary Beth Norton explains regarding 1828:

The platforms, speeches and editorials were founded upon a broad consensus among Democrats. As Norton et al. explain:

Jackson vetoed more legislation than all previous presidents combined. The long-term effect was to create the modern, strong presidency. Jackson and his supporters also opposed reform as a movement. Reformers eager to turn their programs into legislation called for a more active government. However, Democrats tended to oppose programs like educational reform and the establishment of a public education system. For instance, they believed that public schools restricted individual liberty by interfering with parental responsibility and undermined freedom of religion by replacing church schools.

Jackson looked at the Indian question in terms of military and legal policy, not as a problem due to their race. In 1813, Jackson adopted and treated as his own son a three-year-old Indian orphan—seeing in him a fellow orphan that was "so much like myself I feel an unusual sympathy for him". In legal terms, when it became a matter of state sovereignty versus tribal sovereignty he went with the states and forced the Indians to fresh lands with no white rivals in what became known as the Trail of Tears.

Among the leading followers was Stephen A. Douglas, senator from Illinois, who was the key player in the passage of the compromise of 1850, and was a leading contender for the 1852 Democratic presidential nomination. According to his biographer Robert W. Johanssen:

Reforms

Jackson fulfilled his promise of broadening the influence of the citizenry in government, although not without vehement controversy over his methods.

Jacksonian policies included ending the bank of the United States, expanding westward and removing American Indians from the Southeast. Jackson was denounced as a tyrant by opponents on both ends of the political spectrum such as Henry Clay and John C. Calhoun. This led to the rise of the Whig Party.

Jackson created a spoils system to clear out elected officials in government of an opposing party and replace them with his supporters as a reward for their electioneering. With Congress controlled by his enemies, Jackson relied heavily on the power of the veto to block their moves.

One of the most important of these was the Maysville Road veto in 1830. A part of Clay's American System, the bill would have allowed for federal funding of a project to construct a road linking Lexington and the Ohio River, the entirety of which would be in the state of Kentucky, Clay's home state. His primary objection was based on the local nature of the project. He argued it was not the federal government's job to fund projects of such a local nature and or those lacking a connection to the nation as a whole. The debates in Congress reflected two competing visions of federalism. The Jacksonians saw the union strictly as the cooperative aggregation of the individual states, while the Whigs saw the entire nation as a distinct entity.

Carl Lane argues "securing national debt freedom was a core element of Jacksonian democracy". Paying off the national debt was a high priority which would make a reality of the Jeffersonian vision of America truly free from rich bankers, self-sufficient in world affairs, virtuous at home, and administered by a small government not prone to financial corruption or payoffs.

What became of Jacksonian Democracy, according to Sean Wilentz was diffusion. Many ex-Jacksonians turned their crusade against the Money Power into one against the Slave Power and became Republicans. He points to the struggle over the Wilmot Proviso of 1846, the Free Soil Party revolt of 1848, and the mass defections from the Democrats in 1854 over the Kansas–Nebraska Act. Other Jacksonian leaders such as Chief Justice Roger B. Taney endorsed slavery through the 1857 Dred Scott decision. Southern Jacksonians overwhelmingly endorsed secession in 1861, apart from a few opponents led by Andrew Johnson. In the North, Jacksonians Martin Van Buren, Stephen A. Douglas and the War Democrats fiercely opposed secession, while Franklin Pierce, James Buchanan and the Copperheads did not.

Jacksonian Presidents
In addition to Jackson, his second Vice President and one of the key organizational leaders of the Jacksonian Democratic Party, Martin Van Buren, served as president. He helped shape modern presidential campaign organizations and methods.

Van Buren was defeated in 1840 by Whig William Henry Harrison. Harrison died just 30 days into his term and his Vice President John Tyler quickly reached accommodation with the Jacksonians. Tyler was then succeeded by James K. Polk, a Jacksonian who won the election of 1844 with Jackson's endorsement. Franklin Pierce had been a supporter of Jackson as well. James Buchanan served in Jackson's administration as Minister to Russia and as Polk's Secretary of State, but he did not pursue Jacksonian policies. Finally, Andrew Johnson, who had been a strong supporter of Jackson, became president following the assassination of Abraham Lincoln in 1865, but by then Jacksonian democracy had been pushed off the stage of American politics.

See also
 Andrew Jackson 1828 presidential campaign
 History of the Democratic Party (United States)
 Jeffersonian democracy
 Populism in the United States 
 Voting rights in the United States

Notes

References and bibliography

 Adams, Sean Patrick, ed. A Companion to the Era of Andrew Jackson (2013). table of contents 
 
 
 
  Short essays.
 
 Cave, Alfred A. "The Jacksonian movement in American historiography" (PhD, U Florida, 1961) online free; 258pp; bibliog pp 240–58
 
 Cheathem, Mark R. and Terry Corps, eds. Historical Dictionary of the Jacksonian Era and Manifest Destiny (2nd ed. 2016), 544pp
 
  Uses quantitative electoral data.
 
  Uses quantitative electoral data.
  Uses quantitative electoral data.
 
 
 
  summary of Chapter 8, an excerpt from his Pulitzer-prize-winning Banks and Politics in America: From the Revolution to the Civil War (1954).
  Chapter on AJ.
 Hofstadter, Richard. "William Leggett:  Spokesman of Jacksonian Democracy."  Political Science Quarterly 58#4 (December 1943):  581–94.  in JSTOR 
 
 
 
 Howe, Daniel Walker. What Hath God Wrought: The Transformation of America, 1815–1848 (Oxford History of the United States) (2009), Pulitzer Prize; surveys era from anti-Jacksonian perspective
 
 
 
 Lane, Carl. "The Elimination of the National Debt in 1835 and the Meaning Of Jacksonian Democracy." Essays in Economic & Business History 25 (2007). online 
 
  Influential state-by-state study.
 McKnight, Brian D., and James S. Humphreys, eds.  The Age of Andrew Jackson: Interpreting American History (Kent State University Press; 2012) 156 pages; historiography
 
 
 
 
  Important scholarly articles.
  Abridgment of Remini's 3-volume biography.
 
 Rowland, Thomas J. Franklin B. Pierce: The Twilight of Jacksonian Democracy (Nova Science Publisher's, 2012).
  Influential reinterpretation
 Shade, William G. "Politics and Parties in Jacksonian America," Pennsylvania Magazine of History and Biography Vol. 110, No. 4 (October 1986), pp. 483–507 online
  Uses quantitative electoral data.
  Winner of the Pulitzer Prize for History.
 
  Uses quantitative electoral data.
 
 
 Simeone, James. "Reassessing Jacksonian Political Culture: William Leggett's Egalitarianism." American Political Thought 4#3 (2015): 359–390. in JSTOR 
 
  Excerpts from primary and secondary sources.
  Standard scholarly survey.
 
 
 Wellman, Judith. Grassroots Reform in the Burned-over District of Upstate New York: Religion, Abolitionism, and Democracy (Routledge, 2014).
 
  Highly detailed scholarly synthesis.
  Intellectual history of Whigs and Democrats.

Primary sources
 Blau, Joseph L., ed. Social Theories of Jacksonian Democracy: Representative Writings of the Period 1825–1850 (1954) online edition 
 Eaton, Clement ed. The Leaven of Democracy: The Growth of the Democratic Spirit in the Time of Jackson (1963) online edition

External links
 American Political History Online 
 Second Party System 1824–1860 short essays by scholar Michael Holt
 Tales of the Early Republic collection of texts and encyclopedia entries on Jacksonian Era, by Hal Morris
 Register of Debates in Congress, 1824–1837; complete text; searchable
 Daniel Webster 
 debate, 1830 on nullification & tariff
 The works of Daniel Webster... 6 vol, 1853 edition
  Documents on Indian removal 1831–1833 
 War with Mexico: links 
 Hammond, The history of political parties in the state of New-York(1850) history to 1840 from MOA Michigan
 Triumph of Nationalism 1815–1850 study guides & teaching tools

19th century in the United States
Agrarian politics
American political philosophy
Andrew Jackson
Classical liberalism
Eponymous political ideologies
Factions in the Democratic Party (United States)
History of United States expansionism

Left-wing populism in the United States
Liberalism in the United States
Political history of the United States
Political theories
Populism
Antebellum South
Slavery in the United States
Racism in the United States
Radicalism (historical)
Second Party System
Types of democracy
Western (genre) staples and terminology
1820s in American politics
1830s in American politics
1840s in American politics
1850s in American politics